Shelania is an extinct genus of prehistoric frogs that lived in South America during the Eocene. Its type species is Shelania pascuali. Fossils of Shelania have been found in the Mustersan Vaca Mahuida and Laguna del Hunco Formations of Argentina.

See also 
 List of prehistoric amphibians

References 

†
Eocene amphibians
Paleogene amphibians of South America
Eocene animals of South America
Mustersan
Bartonian life
Lutetian life
Paleogene Argentina
Fossils of Argentina
Cañadón Asfalto Basin
Fossil taxa described in 1960
Taxa named by Rodolfo Casamiquela